Isopogon polycephalus, commonly known as clustered coneflower, is a species of plant in the family Proteaceae and is endemic to the South coast of Western Australia. It is a spreading shrub with linear to lance-shaped leaves with the narrower end towards the base, and clusters of more or less spherical heads of white, cream-coloured or yellow flowers.

Description
The flowers are arranged in sessile, more or less spherical, often clustered heads  in diameter, with linear to narrow egg-shaped involucral bracts at the base.

Taxonomy
Isopogon polycephalus was first formally described in 1810 by Robert Brown in Transactions of the Linnean Society. The specific epithet (polycephalus) means "many-headed".

Distribution and habitat
Clustered coneflower grows in sandy soil in heath or sandplain between East Mount Barren and Condingup, near the south coast of Western Australia.

Conservation status
Isopogon polycephalus is classified as "not threatened" by the Government of Western Australia Department of Parks and Wildlife.

References

polycephalus
Endemic flora of Western Australia
Eudicots of Western Australia
Plants described in 1810
Taxa named by Robert Brown (botanist, born 1773)